The 1968 British League Division Two season was the inaugural season of a second tier of motorcycle speedway in Great Britain.

Summary
The formation of a new division 2 was a success and attracted five new clubs to league speedway, the Nelson Admirals from Nelson in Lancashire, the Crayford Highwaymen from east London, the Canterbury Crusaders from Kent, the Berwick Bandits from Scotland and the Reading Racers. Additionally three other clubs, Middlesbrough, Plymouth and Rayleigh returned to league action having previously competed in the old defunct Provincial League and Weymouth returned after a 13 year absence.

Belle Vue Aces, members of the first division, fielded a reserve side known as Belle Vue Colts and won the first league title. Colt's riders Taffy Owen, Ken Eyre, Eric Broadbelt and John Woodcock all scored heavily and ended with impressive averages. Canterbury in their first season of existence won the division 2 Knockout Cup beating another new team Reading in the final.

Final table

British League Division Two Knockout Cup
The 1968 British League Division Two Knockout Cup was the first edition of the Knockout Cup for tier two teams and coincided with the newly formed league.

Previously the tier two and tier three teams had competed in the National Trophy until 1964, and although they held their own finals during some years it only served as qualification for the main competition. Canterbury Crusaders were the winners of the competition.

First round

Quarter-finals

Semi-finals

Final

First leg

Second leg

Canterbury were declared Knockout Cup Champions, winning on aggregate 112–80.

Leading final averages

Riders & final averages
Belle Vue Colts

Taffy Owen 9.35
Ken Eyre 8.94
Eric Broadbelt 8.15
John Woodcock 8.15
Chris Bailey 7.74
Ken Moss 6.33
Peter Thompson 5.93
Brian Bentley 5.49

Berwick

Bill McMillan 9.12
Bernie Lagrosse/Roy Williams 7.85
Brian Whaley 7.69
Brian Black 6.81
Mark Hall 6.59
Lex Milloy 5.89
Grieves Davidson 4.53
Alex Nichol 3.51
Tom Blackwood 3.37
Colin Robertson 2.71

Canterbury

Peter Murray 10.05 
Barry Crowson 8.44 
Ken Vale 8.00
Martyn Piddock 7.96 
John Hibben 6.85
Tyburn Gallows 4.91
Pat Flanagan 4.61
Chris Raines 4.57
Frank Wendon 4.30
Barry Lee 3.15

Crayford

Mick Handley 10.48
Tony Childs 7.68
Derek Timms 6.54
Colin Clark 6.05
Dai Evans 5.88
Geoff Ambrose 5.87 
Stuart Riley 5.12
Tony Armstrong 4.31

Middlesbrough
 
Allan Brown 9.63 
Graham Plant 8.54
Graham Edmonds 8.31
Tom Leadbitter 6.82
Terry Lee 6.78
Paul O'Neal 6.07
Pete Reading 4.75
Alan Palmer 3.25
John Spilsbury 2.09

Nelson
 
Dave Schofield 9.54
Alan Paynter 9.10
Murray Burt 8.76 
Gary Peterson 8.14
Terry Shearer 6.76
Dave Beacon 5.79
Jack Winstanley 5.51
Paul Sharples 4.15

Plymouth

Mike Cake 10.22 
Chris Bass 10.15
Phil Woodcock 6.67
Tony George 6.13 
Dave Whittaker 6.08
Keith Marks 5.69
Frank Payne 5.07
Chris Roynon 4.75
Ian Gills 3.23

Rayleigh

Graeme Smith 7.55
Mike Gardner 7.49
Dennis Mannion 7.44
Dingle Brown 6.48
Laurie Etheridge 6.20
Geoff Maloney 6.06
Terry Stone 6.03
Colin Tucker 3.09

Reading

John Poyser 9.29 
Ian Champion 6.91
Joe Weichlbauer 6.88
Ted Spittles 6.68
Stuart Wallace 6.20
Dene Davies 5.39
Ian Bottomley 4.91
Phil Pratt 4.59

Weymouth

Tony Lomas 9.39
Mike Vernam 7.94
Barry Duke 7.71
Chris Yeatman 6.14
Mick Steel 5.08
Roy Carter 4.58
Adrian Degan 3.05
Phil Arnold 2.72

See also
List of United Kingdom Speedway League Champions
Knockout Cup (speedway)

References

Speedway British League Division Two / National League